Celidothrips is a genus of thrips in the family Phlaeothripidae.

Species
 Celidothrips adiaphorus
 Celidothrips camelus
 Celidothrips dolichos
 Celidothrips lawrencei

References

Phlaeothripidae
Thrips
Thrips genera